= Lebanon-Wilson County Events Center =

Multi-purpose arena in Tennessee

Lebanon-Wilson County Events Center is a 7,000-seat multi-purpose arena in Lebanon, Tennessee, United States planned for construction in 2007. However construction had still not begun In October 2011.
